A Web Part, also called a Web Widget, is an ASP.NET server control which is added to a Web Part Zone on Web Part Pages by users at run time. The controls enable end users to modify the content, appearance, and behavior of Web pages directly from a browser. It can be put into certain places in a web page by end users, after development by a programmer.

Web Parts can be used as an add-on ASP.NET technology to Windows SharePoint Services.

Web Parts are equivalent to Portlets, but don't necessarily require a web portal such as SharePoint to host them.

See also
 Portlet
 Web widget
 ASP.NET
 Windows SharePoint Services
 SharePoint Portal Server
 Microsoft Office SharePoint Server 2007
 Microsoft SharePoint 2010

External links
 ASP.NET Web Parts Controls

ASP.NET

he:SharePoint#Web part